The Avawatz Mountains are located in San Bernardino County, California, in the Mojave Desert.

Name
There are several theories for the origin of the name Avawatz. It could be derived from the Mohave Indian term "Avi-Ahwat", or "red rock".  Alternatively, the name comes from the Southern Paiute word iva-wätz, meaning "white mountain sheep," or another Southern Paiute word, ávawatz, meaning "gypsum".

Geography
The range lies to the west of State Route 127; between the Owlshead Mountains in the southern end of Death Valley National Park, and the Soda Mountains near the town of Baker. The range is at the intersection of the Garlock Fault and the Death Valley Fault Zone. As such, it is considered the southern end of the Walker Lane geologic trough.

Part of the Avawatz Mountain range lies in the National Training Center, which is part of the Fort Irwin Military Reservation, and is closed to the public.

References

California Road and Recreation Atlas, 2005, pg 96

Mountain ranges of the Mojave Desert
Mountain ranges of San Bernardino County, California
Mountain ranges of Southern California